Time After Time is the debut album released on Quality Records by freestyle singer Timmy T on June 20, 1990, by Quality Records label. It peaked at No. 46 on the Billboard 200 albums chart.

Six singles were released from the album. "One More Try", the most successful single, reached number one on the Billboard Hot 100 chart in the United States. "Over and Over", "Time After Time", and "What Will I Do" also cracked the Hot 100.

Track listing

Japanese Edition

1991 Edition

Chart positions

Singles

References

1990 debut albums
Timmy T albums